{{DISPLAYTITLE:Psi2 Aquarii}}

Psi2 Aquarii, Latinized from ψ2 Aquarii, is the Bayer designation for a star in the equatorial constellation of Aquarius. It is visible to the naked eye with an apparent visual magnitude of 4.4.

This is a B-type main sequence star with a stellar classification of B5 Vn. The 'n' suffix indicates that the absorption lines in the spectrum are being broadened by Doppler shift from the star's rapid rotation rate. The projected rotational velocity of the star is 341 km/s. Psi2 Aquarii is 4.6 times as large as the Sun with an effective temperature of 15,212 K in its outer envelope.

It is a λ Eridani variable, or periodic Be star, with a pulsation cycle lasting 1.073 days. The amplitude of the variation is 0.024 in magnitude.

References

External links
 Image Psi2 Aquarii

219688
Aquarii, Psi2
Aquarii, 093
Aquarius (constellation)
B-type main-sequence stars
115033
8858
BD-09 6160
Lambda Eridani variables